Cassidy is a common Irish surname and is sometimes used as a given name. The surname translates to "descendant of Caiside". Variations include: Cassady, Cassiday, Cassedy, Casadei and Cassedey. The family was originally a Munster sept called Uí Chaisín but in the 12th century a branch moved to Devenish Island in County Fermanagh, where they became a medical and poetic family, hereditary physicians to the Maguires.

People
 Barrie Cassidy, Australian journalist
 Bernard Matthew Cassidy, British soldier
 Bill Cassidy, American politician and physician
 Bob Cassidy, mentalist, speaker and author
 Butch Cassidy, notorious Wild West criminal
 Christopher Cassidy, American astronaut
 Claudia Cassidy, American critic
 Colette Cassidy, former primetime newsbreak anchor for MSNBC
 Damian Cassidy, Irish Gaelic footballer
 Daniel Cassidy (1943–2008), American writer, filmmaker and academic
 Daniel Cassidy (footballer) ( 1926–1937), English football player
 David Cassidy (1950–2017), American musician, actor and erstwhile teen idol of Partridge Family fame, son of Jack Cassidy
 Derek Cassidy (born 1986), American football player
 Donie Cassidy, Irish politician and businessman
 Ed Cassidy, American drummer
 Edward Cassidy (1924–2021), Australian Roman Catholic cardinal 
 Elaine Cassidy, Irish actress
 Elaine Cassidy (mayor), Australian politician
 Eva Cassidy (1963–1996), American singer
 George Cassidy (disambiguation), several people
 Harry Cassidy, Canadian academic and social reformer
 Jack Cassidy, Irish-American actor, father of David, Shaun and Patrick Cassidy
 James Cassidy (disambiguation), several people
 Joanna Cassidy, American actress
 John Cassidy (disambiguation), several people
 Joseph Cassidy (disambiguation), several people named Joe or Joseph
 Katie Cassidy, American singer and actress, daughter of David Cassidy
 Lewis C. Cassidy, Pennsylvania Attorney General
 Matthew Cassidy, Irish footballer
 Michael Cassidy (disambiguation), several people
 Natalie Cassidy, English soap actress
 Orange Cassidy (born 1984), ring name of American professional wrestler James Cipperly
 Owen Cassidy (1862–1911), New York politician
 Patrick Cassidy (disambiguation), several people
 Raffey Cassidy, English child actress
 Raquel Cassidy, English actress
 Scott Cassidy, American baseball player
 Shaun Cassidy, American celebrity, son of Jack Cassidy
 Stephen Cassidy, American labor leader
 Ted Cassidy, American actor
 Virginia Dell {Cassidy} Blythe Clinton Dwire Kelley, mother of US President Bill Clinton
 William F. Cassidy, American military

Fiction
 Black Tom Cassidy, a Marvel Comics supervillain
 Cole Cassidy, a fictional character in the Blizzard Entertainment's 2016 video game Overwatch
 Hopalong Cassidy, a fictional cowboy created by Clarence E. Mulford
 Kid Cassidy, a member of the Gunhawks
 Proinsias Cassidy, a vampire from the Vertigo comic book series Preacher
 Sean Cassidy, aka Banshee, Marvel Comics superhero 
 Theresa Cassidy, aka Siryn, Marvel Comics superheroine

See also
 Cassady (name), given name and surname
 Cassidy (given name)

References

External links 
 Cassidy Clan (official site)

English-language surnames
Anglicised Irish-language surnames
Irish medical families

de:Cassidy (Name)
it:Cassidy (nome)